The Sonate pour violon et piano (Violin Sonata), FP 119, by Francis Poulenc was composed in 1942–1943 in memory of the Spanish poet Federico García Lorca. The score, dedicated to Poulenc's niece Brigitte Manceaux, was published by Max Eschig. The work was premiered by the violinist Ginette Neveu with the composer at the piano on 21 June 1943 in Paris, Salle Gaveau.

Genesis and creation 
Francis Poulenc tried several times to write a sonata for a string instrument. As early as 1918, he made sketches for a  violin sonata, which he later destroyed. He made several further attempts between 1925 and 1935. The published violin sonata was at least the fourth approach, and the only one to have been preserved. As Poulenc himself pointed out, he did "not like the violin in the singular". The writing of the sonata was largely due to the insistence of Ginette Neveu whom he did not want to antagonize and who gave him many tips for the violin part. He later confessed that "the few delicious violinistic details of the score" were due to Neveu.

Poulenc wrote, when he completed the draft of the sonata: 

The work was premiered during a concert de la Pléiade at the Salle Gaveau in Paris 21 June 1943 with Ginette Neveu, violin, and the composer as pianist; the violinist's performance was  appreciated even if the criticisms of the work were negative. Poulenc revised the sonata in 1949.

Reception and legacy 
In his work Journal de mes mélodies, the composer himself is critical of this sonata: "I am struggling to testify, musically, of my passion for Lorca, but my Sonata for piano and violin, dedicated to his memory, is alas not the best Poulenc".

The sonata was judged harshly by critics. Adélaïde de Place wrote in the Guide la musique de chambre (published by the editions Fayard): "this work in three movements ... is a little disappointing". The Poulenc biographer Henri Hell claims that its "only merit is to have been written in memory of Federico García Lorca ... Poulenc is no longer quite Poulenc when he writes for the violin".

There are, however, numerous recordings of the work, including that of the virtuoso violinist Yehudi Menuhin accompanied by Jacques Février on the piano.

Style 

Poulenc was little inspired by string instruments, (as can be seen in other works, for example the Cello Sonata written between 1940 and 1948). The sonata uses borrowings, including self-citations. At one point he uses one of the oboe themes of the "letter song" from the opera Eugene Onegin by Pyotr Ilyich Tchaikovsky. The thematic influence of Sergei Rachmaninov can also be heard in the work.

Structure and analysis 
Like most of the composer's chamber works, the sonata, with a performance time of 15 to 18 minutes, adopts a fast-slow-fast three-movement plan:
 Allegro con fuoco
 Intermezzo
 Presto tragico

The execution time of each movement is about 5 to 6 minutes.

Allegro con fuoco cites the first of Trois Poèmes by Louise Lalanne. The central passage of the Intermezzo in thirds, by the violin, is the summit of the work. From the point of view of harmonic style, this movement is the least in the usual language of the composer and denotes a "vaguely Spanish" memory.

Selected recordings 
 Yehudi Menuhin and Jacques Février
 Josef Suk and Jan Panenka, 1967
 Dan Almgren and Stefan Bojsten. Recorded by SVT in 1985
Detlef Hahn and Simon Parkin. Recorded in 2000

References

Bibliography

External links 
 
 Francis Poulenc, Sonata for violin & piano, FP 119 on AllMusic
 Violin Sonata Kennedy Center
 Francis Poulenc-Violin Sonata on YouTube

Compositions by Francis Poulenc
Poulenc Francis, violin sonata
1942 compositions